Stęszów may refer to the following places in Poland:
Stęszów, Lower Silesian Voivodeship (south-west Poland)
Stęszów, Łódź Voivodeship (central Poland)